John Little (17 May 1912 − 15 October 2007) was an English professional footballer. During his career he made almost 150 appearances for Ipswich Town. After retiring from professional football, he joined Stowmarket Town as player-coach.

He died in October 2007, aged 95.

References

External links
Jackie Little Pride of Anglia

1912 births
English footballers
Ipswich Town F.C. players
Association football wingers
2007 deaths
English Football League players
Stowmarket Town F.C. players
Footballers from Gateshead